Aleksandra Krystyna Natalli-Świat (20 February 1959 – 10 April 2010) was a Polish economist and politician. She was elected to Sejm on 25 September 2005, getting 5068 votes in 3 Wrocław district, from the Law and Justice candidate list.

Natalli-Świat died in the 2010 Polish Air Force Tu-154 crash near Smolensk on 10 April 2010.

On 16 April 2010 she was posthumously awarded the Commander's Cross of the Order of Polonia Restituta. On the same day, the Parliament of the Province of Lower Silesia awarded her the title of Honorary Citizen of Lower Silesia. She was buried on 26 April 2010 at the Cemetery of the Holy Spirit in Wroclaw.

See also
 Members of Polish Sejm 2005–2007
 Members of Polish Sejm 2007–2011

References

External links
 Aleksandra Natalli-Świat - official website
 Aleksandra Natalli-Świat - parliamentary page – includes declarations of interest, voting record, and transcripts of speeches.

1959 births
2010 deaths
Polish economists
Polish women economists
People from Oborniki Śląskie
Members of the Polish Sejm 2005–2007
Women members of the Sejm of the Republic of Poland
Members of the Polish Sejm 2007–2011
Law and Justice politicians
Victims of the Smolensk air disaster
Commanders of the Order of Polonia Restituta
Polish Roman Catholics
21st-century Polish women politicians